The 2003–04 BSC Young Boys season was the club's 106th season in existence and the club's third consecutive season in the top flight of Swiss football. In addition to the domestic league, Young Boys participated in this season's editions of the Swiss Cup and the UEFA Cup.

Pre-season and friendlies

Competitions

Overall record

Swiss Super League

League table

Results summary

Results by round

Matches 

Source:

Swiss Cup 

Source:

UEFA Cup

Qualifying round

References

External links

BSC Young Boys seasons
Young Boys